This is the list of the 16 members of the European Parliament for Denmark in the 1984 to 1989 session.

List

Notes

1984
List
Denmark